Giusella Finocchiaro is Professor of Private Law and Internet Law at the University of Bologna, Italy. She is also the founder of her own private legal practice.

Besides her professional role, Giusella Finocchiaro is also the Chairperson of Working Group 4 (Electronic Commerce) of UNCITRAL (the United Nations Commission on International Trade Law). She has been Chairperson since 28 April 2014.

Her professional field of interest focuses on research into Privacy Law on the Internet. She is the author of 9 books and editor of 6 books.  She has also written more than one hundred articles in the field of e-Commerce, Electronic Signatures, Intellectual Property Rights and Digital Identity.

She is the President of the Fondazione del Monte di Bologna e Ravenna, for the 2015-2020 mandate.

From 2007 to 2009 she was a member of the European Network and Information Security Agency Permanent Stakeholders Group

References

External links 
Uncitral website
University of Bologna Website
Giusella Finocchiaro  and blog

Living people
Italian officials of the United Nations
Academic staff of the University of Bologna
1964 births
Italian women lawyers
Place of birth missing (living people)
20th-century Italian lawyers
21st-century Italian lawyers
20th-century women lawyers
21st-century women lawyers